The 2010 Fed Cup (also known as the 2010 Fed Cup by BNP Paribas for sponsorship purposes) was the 48th edition of the tournament between national teams in women's tennis.

The final took place at the San Diego Sports Arena in San Diego, United States, on 6–7 November. Italy successfully defended their title, in a rematch of the previous year's final, against the United States, by three rubbers to one.

World Group

Draw

World Group play-offs 

The four losing teams in the World Group first round ties (France, Germany, Serbia and Ukraine), and four winners of the World Group II ties (Australia, Belgium, Estonia and Slovakia) enter the draw for the World Group play-offs. Four seeded teams, based on the latest Fed Cup ranking, are drawn against four unseeded teams.

Date: 24–25 April

World Group II 

The World Group II was the second highest level of Fed Cup competition in 2010. Winners advanced to the World Group play-offs, and losers played in the World Group II play-offs.

Date: 6–7 February

World Group II play-offs 

The four losing teams from World Group II (Argentina, China, Poland and Spain) played off against qualifiers from Zonal Group I. Two teams qualified from Europe/Africa Zone (Slovenia and Sweden), one team from the Asia/Oceania Zone (Japan), and one team from the Americas Zone (Canada).

Date: 24–25 April

Americas Zone 

 Nations in bold advanced to the higher level of competition.
 Nations in italics were relegated down to a lower level of competition.

Group I 
Venue: Yacht y Golf Club Paraguayo, Lambaré, Paraguay (outdoor clay)

Dates: 3–6 February

Participating Teams

Group II 
Venue: National Tennis Club, Guayaquil, Ecuador (outdoor clay)

Dates: 19–24 April

Participating Teams

Asia/Oceania Zone 

 Nations in bold advanced to the higher level of competition.
 Nations in italics were relegated down to a lower level of competition.

Group I 
Venue: National Tennis Centre, Kuala Lumpur, Malaysia (outdoor hard)

Dates: 3–6 February

Participating Teams

Group II 
Venue: National Tennis Centre, Kuala Lumpur, Malaysia (outdoor hard)

Dates: 3–6 February

Participating Teams

Europe/Africa Zone 

 Nations in bold advanced to the higher level of competition.
 Nations in italics were relegated down to a lower level of competition.

Group I 
Venue: Complexo de Tenis do Jamor, Cruz Quebrada, Portugal (indoor hard)

Dates: 3–6 February

Participating Teams

Group II 
Venue: Orange Fitness & Tennis Club, Yerevan, Armenia (outdoor clay)

Dates: 28 April – 1 May

Participating Teams

Group III 
Venue: Smash Tennis Academy, Cairo, Egypt (outdoor clay)

Dates: 21–24 April

Participating Teams

Rankings 
The rankings were measured after the three points during the year that play took place, and were collated by combining points earned from the previous four years.

References

External links 
 2010 Fed Cup

 
Fed Cup
Billie Jean King Cups by year
2010 in women's tennis